WJFL (101.9 FM) is a radio station broadcasting an adult contemporary format. Licensed to Tennille, Georgia, United States, the station is currently owned by Middle Georgia Broadcasting, Inc. and features programming from ABC Radio .

References

External links

JFL
Mainstream adult contemporary radio stations in the United States